Thunder Alley may refer to:
 Thunder Alley (TV series), an American sitcom
 Thunder Alley (1967 film), a film about auto racing
 Thunder Alley (1985 film), an American drama film
 Thunder Alley (Kings Island), an amusement park attraction